The Republic of China competed as Chinese Taipei at the 2000 Summer Olympics in Sydney, Australia.
The change in name was due to the political status of Taiwan. In addition, they flew a flag especially designed for the games separate from the flag of the Republic of China.

Medalists

Results by event

Archery

Chinese Taipei entered three women in the archery competition. Each was defeated in the second round. As a team, they also lost the second round.

Women's team:
 Wen, Liu, and Lin – quarterfinal, 8th place (1-1)

Athletics
Men's 400 m Hurdles
 Chen Tien-Wen
 Round 1 – 50.52 (did not advance)

Women's 100 m
 Chen Shu-Chuan
 Round 1 – 12.22 (did not advance)

Badminton
Men's singles
Fung Permadi
 Round of 64: Bye 
 Round of 32: Defeated Mihail Popov of Bulgaria
 Round of 16: Lost to Peter Gade of Denmark

Women's singles
Huang Chia-Chi
 Round of 64: Bye 
 Round of 32: Defeated Nely Boteva of Bulgaria
 Round of 16: Defeated Lee Kyung-won of Korea
 Quarterfinal: Lost to Ye Zhaoying of China
Chan Ya-Lin
 Round of 64: Bye 
 Round of 32: Defeated Rayoni Head of Australia
 Round of 16: Lost to Mia Audina Tjiptawan of Netherlands

Women's doubles
Tsai Hui-Min, Chen Li-Chin
 Round of 32: Lost to Yim Kyung-Jin, Lee Hyo-jung of Korea

Cycling

Road Cycling
Women's Road Race
 Chen Chiung-Yi
 Final – 3:28:00 (45th place)

Track Cycling
Women's Point Race
Fang Fen-Fang
Points – 0 (13th place)

Diving
Men's 3 Metre Springboard
 Chen Han-Hung
 Preliminary – 188.46 (49th place, did not advance)

Women's 3 Metre Springboard
 Chen Ting
 Preliminary – 229.77 (29th place, did not advance)

Women's 3 Metre Springboard
 Tsai Yi-San
 Preliminary – 181.92 (41st place, did not advance)

Women's 10 Metre Platform
 Hsieh Pei-Hua
 Preliminary – 284.91
 Semi-final – 126.66 – 411.57 (17th place, did not advance)

Sailing
Men's Mistral
 Ted Huang
 Race 1 – 6 
 Race 2 – 7 
 Race 3 – 16 
 Race 4 – (22)
 Race 5 – 14 
 Race 6 – (17)
 Race 7 – 13 
 Race 8 – 6 
 Race 9 – 8 
 Race 10 – 14 
 Race 11 – 16 
 Final – 100 (13th place)

Swimming
Men's 50 m Freestyle
 Huang Chih-Yung
 Preliminary Heat – 24.01 (did not advance)

Men's 100 m Freestyle
 Wu Nien-Pin
 Preliminary Heat – 52.72 (did not advance)

Men's 200 m Freestyle
 Wu Nien-Pin
 Preliminary Heat – 1:54.58 (did not advance)

Men's 400 m Freestyle
 Li Yun-Lun
 Preliminary Heat – 04:03.10 (did not advance)

Men's 1500 m Freestyle
 Li Yun-Lun
 Preliminary Heat – 16:13.05 (did not advance)

Men's 100 m Butterfly
 Tseng Cheng-Hua
 Preliminary Heat – 56.39 (did not advance)

Men's 200 m Butterfly
 Tseng Cheng-Hua
 Preliminary Heat – 02:03.62 (did not advance)

Men's 100 m Breaststroke
 Yang Shang-Hsuan
 Preliminary Heat – 01:04.54 (did not advance)

Men's 200 m Breaststroke
 Li Tsung-Chueh
 Preliminary Heat – 02:19.30 (did not advance)

Men's 200 m Individual Medley
 Wu Nien-Pin
 Preliminary Heat – 02:08.85 (did not advance)

Men's 400 m Individual Medley
 Hsu Kuo-Tung
 Preliminary Heat – 04:42.78 (did not advance)

Women's 50 m Freestyle
 Chiang Tzu-Ying
 Preliminary Heat – 26.84 (did not advance)

Women's 100 m Freestyle
 Tsai Shu-min
 Preliminary Heat – 59.39 (did not advance)

Women's 200 m Freestyle
 Tsai Shu-min
 Preliminary Heat – 02:06.12 (did not advance)

Women's 400 m Freestyle
 Lin Chi-Chan
 Preliminary Heat – 04:17.76 (did not advance)

Women's 800 m Freestyle
 Lin Chi-Chan
 Preliminary Heat – 09:01.09 (did not advance)

Women's 100 m Butterfly
 Hsieh Shu-Ting
 Preliminary Heat – 01:03.52 (did not advance)

Women's 200 m Butterfly
 Hsieh Shu-Tzu
 Preliminary Heat – 02:16.23 (did not advance)

Women's 100 m Backstroke
 Kuan Chia-Hsien
 Preliminary Heat – 01:07.18 (did not advance)

Women's 200 m Backstroke
 Kuan Chia-Hsien
 Preliminary Heat – 02:24.61 (did not advance)

Table Tennis

Chen Jing won the singles women's table tennis.

Taekwondo

Huang Chih-hsiung won the bronze in 58 kg men's. Chi Shu-Ju won the bronze in 49 kg women's.

Weightlifting

Men

Women

References

Wallechinsky, David (2004). The Complete Book of the Summer Olympics (Athens 2004 Edition). Toronto, Canada. . 
International Olympic Committee (2001). The Results. Retrieved 12 November 2005.
Sydney Organising Committee for the Olympic Games (2001). Official Report of the XXVII Olympiad Volume 1: Preparing for the Games. Retrieved 20 November 2005.
Sydney Organising Committee for the Olympic Games (2001). Official Report of the XXVII Olympiad Volume 2: Celebrating the Games. Retrieved 20 November 2005.
Sydney Organising Committee for the Olympic Games (2001). The Results. Retrieved 20 November 2005.
International Olympic Committee Web Site

Nations at the 2000 Summer Olympics
2000
2000 in Taiwanese sport